This is the discography of Scottish post-punk/new wave band the Associates.

Albums

Studio albums

Compilation albums

Remix albums

EPs

Singles

Selected compilation appearances
"Aggressive and Ninety Pounds" (as 'the Associates featuring Billy Mackenzie') on Mad Mix II cassette (1983), NME

References

Discographies of British artists
Pop music discographies
Rock music discographies
New wave discographies